This article covers various hoax letter writers.

Henry Root 
Henry Root is the creation of writer William Donaldson who wrote to numerous public figures with unusual or outlandish questions and requests.  The letters were published as The Henry Root Letters and The Further Letters of Henry Root and a compilation volume, The Complete Henry Root Letters.

The Henry Root character inspired the ITV mini-series, Root Into Europe, starring George Cole.

Others 
Other prank mail and reviewers include:

 John Hargrave of Zug.com, who sent a letter to all US senators, posing as a child and asking them for their favourite joke.
 Bill Geerhart, author of the book Little Billy's Letters (Morrow, 2010)
 Ed Broth - also possibly the creation of comedian Jerry Seinfeld.
 Robin Cooper who wrote The Timewaster Letters - the creation of Robert Popper.
 Ted L. Nancy - the creation of comedian Barry Marder.
 W. Morgan Petty - the nom de plume of Brian Bethell.
 H. Rochester Sneath - the fictional headmaster of the fictional British public school Selhurst, created by Humphry Berkeley.
 the fictitious Lazlo Toth - the creation of actor/writer Don Novello, who played Father Guido Sarducci on Saturday Night Live.
 Edna Welthorpe was a prudish middle-aged housewife who was strongly opposed to her creator Joe Orton's plays.
 James Spence, author of Silly Beggar: The World's Stupidest Begging Letters, wrote absurd comedy emails requesting free items from companies.
 Bob Servant who swapped emails with Internet spammers in the book Delete This At Your Peril - the creation of Neil Forsyth.
 David Thorne, who came to public attention for tongue-in-cheek letters and emails, such as an attempt to "pay" a bill with a drawing of a seven-legged spider (2008) and repeatedly RSVPing for a party to which he had not been invited.
 Liz Reed - another character created by William Donaldson, Reed's TV production pitches - for shows such as 'Disabled Gladiators' and 'Anglotrash' - in the guise of Heart Felt Productions were collected in the 1998 book,  The Heart Felt Letters.

See also
Diary of a Nobody - a fictional diary written by George Grossmith
The Timewaster Diaries - a fictional diary, again written by Robin Cooper (Robert Popper)
Silence Dogood

References

External links 
Henry Raddick: man of letters - Amazon star
"I am not Henry Raddick!" - HRH Prince of Wales
Lloyd Webber web hoaxer unmasked
Henry Raddick discussion at Metafilter
Dear Editor: The Collected Letters of Oscar Brittle at UNSW Press

 
Literary forgeries
Journalistic hoaxes